Acastoides is an extinct genus of trilobite that lived during the Silurian and Devonian. It has been found in Bolivia, France, Morocco, Poland, Turkey and the United Kingdom.

Distribution 
 A. constricta is found in the Silurian of the United Kingdom (Wenlock, Woolhope Shale, Worcestershire, Malvern).

Taxonomy

Species previously assigned to Acastoides 
 A. verneuili = Calmonia terrarocenai

See also 
List of trilobites

References

External links 
Photos of Acastoides sp.
 Acastoides at the Paleobiology Database

Acastidae
Prehistoric life of Europe
Devonian trilobites
Wenlock first appearances
Eifelian extinctions
Silurian trilobites of Europe